Christian Wilhelm Karl Ewald, since 1912 von Ewald, (June 18, 1852 in Rehbach - September 2, 1932 in Darmstadt) was a Grand Duchy of Hesse Minister of State and a Reichsgericht member.

References 

1852 births
1932 deaths
German politicians